DOCKANEMA is an annual international documentary film festival held in Maputo, Mozambique. The first edition was held September 2006, and included more than 70 films. The festival is produced by the Mozambican production company Ebano Multimedia, in association with AMOCINE (Association of Mozambican Filmmakers). The second edition of DOCKANEMA took place September 14 - 23, 2007 in Maputo, including more than 80 films.

External links
 DOCKANEMA official festival site

Documentary film festivals in Mozambique
Film festivals in Mozambique
Festivals in Mozambique